The 1959 Navy Midshipmen football team represented the United States Naval Academy (USNA) as an independent during the 1959 NCAA University Division football season. The team was led by first-year head coach Wayne Hardin.

Schedule

References

Navy
Navy Midshipmen football seasons
Navy Midshipmen football